Megalopyge undulata is a moth of the family Megalopygidae. It was described by Gottlieb August Wilhelm Herrich-Schäffer in 1858. It is found in Brazil, Paraguay and Argentina.

References

Moths described in 1858
Megalopygidae